is a passenger railway station in located in the town of Minabe, Hidaka District, Wakayama Prefecture, Japan, operated by West Japan Railway Company (JR West).

Lines

Station layout
The station consists of one side platform and one island platform connected to the station building by a footbridge. The station is unattended.

Platforms

Adjacent stations

|-
!colspan=5|West Japan Railway Company (JR West)

History
Minabe Station opened on September 21, 1931. With the privatization of the Japan National Railways (JNR) on April 1, 1987, the station came under the aegis of the West Japan Railway Company.

Passenger statistics
In fiscal 2019, the station was used by an average of 709 passengers daily (boarding passengers only).

Surrounding Area
 
 Minabe Town Hall
 Minabe Municipal Southern Elementary School
 Minabe Municipal Southern Junior High School
 Wakayama Prefectural Southern High School

See also
List of railway stations in Japan

References

External links

 MInabe Station Official Site

Railway stations in Wakayama Prefecture
Railway stations in Japan opened in 1931
Minabe, Wakayama